A floating timeline (also known as a sliding timescale) is a device used in fiction, particularly in long-running serials in comics and animation as well as other media, to explain why characters age little or not at all over a period of time—despite real-world markers like notable events, people and technology appearing in the works and correlating with the real world. The term "floating timeline" is used in the comics community to refer to series that take place in a "continuous present". This timeline is due to the fact that the authors have no need to accommodate the aging of their characters, which is also typical of most animated television shows. It is used as a plot device to "explain or explain away inconsistencies in the way that events and characters exist within a world".

When certain stories in comics, especially origin stories, are rewritten, they often retain key events but are updated to a contemporary time, such as with the comic book character Tony Stark, who still gets injured and invents his Iron Man armor in his updated origin stories while the war in which this occurs changes. This is explicitly discussed in Ultimates, with Galactus providing the in-universe conceit that certain events (such as the rediscovery of Captain America) drift through time and stay about 15 years before the floating present. According to Roz Kaveney, a floating timeline is used in comics because of "the commercial need to keep certain characters going forever". In his essay "Authority Apart from Truth: Superhero Comic Book Stories as Myth", Kevin Wanner compares superheroes in comics to figures in mythology, and writes that the use of a sliding timescale in comics is similar to the way ageless figures in myths are depicted interacting with the contemporary world of the storyteller.

The long-running animated television series The Simpsons uses a floating timeline. The first series of Archie comics contained characters that did not age despite references to contemporary trends throughout the comics.

Rex Stout used a floating timeline for his novels and short stories featuring detective Nero Wolfe, which take place contemporaneously with their writing while the characters do not age. Stout told his authorized biographer John McAleer: "Those stories have ignored time for thirty-nine years. Any reader who can't or won't do the same should skip them. I didn't age the characters because I didn't want to. That would have made it cumbersome and would seem to have centered attention on the characters rather than the stories".

Author P. G. Wodehouse set his comedic Jeeves series, about English gentleman Bertie Wooster and his valet Jeeves, when they were written, though the characters aged little or not at all. This allowed for humorous references to contemporary popular culture in the stories, which were published between 1915 and 1974, while the characters remained the same, though some elements of early twentieth-century Britain remained present throughout the series.

See also
 Soap opera rapid aging syndrome

References

Continuity (fiction)
Ageing in fiction
Canons (fiction)
Continuity errors
Narrative techniques
Nonlinear narrative fiction
Fiction about immortality
Setting